Hyas, in Greek mythology, was a Boeotian who was regarded as the ancestor of the ancient Hyantes (Boeotians). His name means rain from hyô, hyetos.

Family 
Hyas was the son of the Titan Atlas and either of the Oceanids, Pleione or Aethra, thus brother to the Pleiades and Hyades. In one account, Hyas instead was called the father of the Hyades by Boeotia.

Mythology

Death 
Hyas was a notable archer who was killed by his intended prey. Some stories have him dying after attempting to rob a lion of its cubs. ''While his [i.e. Hyas] beard was fresh, stags trembled in terror before him, and the hare was welcome prey. But when years matured his manhood, he breavely closed with the shaggy lioness and the boar. He sought the lair and brood of the whelped lioness and was bloody prey to the Libyan beast.''Some have Hyas killed by a serpent, but most commonly he is said to have been gored by a wild boar. His sisters, the Hyades, mourned his death with so much vehemence and dedication that they died of grief. Zeus, in recognition of their familial love, took pity upon them and changed them into stars—the constellation Hyades—and placed them  in the head of Taurus, where their annual rising and setting are accompanied by plentiful rain.''His {i.e. Hyas]] mother [Aethra] sobbed for Hyas, his sad sisters sobbed and Atlas, whose neck would haul the world. The sisters surpassed both parents in pious love and won heaven. Their name is from Hyas."

Interpretation 
The mythological use for a Hyas, apparently a back formation from Hyades, may simply have been to provide a male figure to consort with the archaic rain-nymphs, the Hyades, a chaperone responsible for their behavior, as all the archaic sisterhoods— even the Muses— needed to be controlled under the Olympian world-picture (Ruck and Staples). In fact among the poets it is immaterial whether Hyas is described as their father or their brother. And his death gave these weepy rain-nymphs a cause for their weeping, mourning for a male being an acceptably passive female role in the patriarchal culture of the Hellenes. Hyas had no separate existence except as progenitor/guardian of the Hyantes, neither in mythic narrative nor in rite, even the alternative accounts of his demise being somewhat conventional and interchangeable: compare the death of Meleager or Actaeon.

Hyantes 
The Hyantes, descendants of Hyas—or rather of the Hyades, for the fertility of rain-nymphs needs no male consort— were the original ("Pelasgian") inhabitants of Boeotia, from which country they were expelled by the followers of Cadmus. Into late Classical times (as by Pausanias, for example), Cadmus was remembered as having been a Phoenician, or at least backed by a Phoenician army, and there may be a nugget of political reality at the heart of the myth, that a Phoenician colony established along the Boeotian coast had displaced some of the area's aboriginal inhabitants while absorbing others.

Some of the Hyantes are said to have emigrated to isolated and pastoral Phocis, where they founded Hyampolis, or at least that gave a good etiological explanation for the city's name. Others supposedly fled to Aetolia, another region that retained a primitive character into Classical times. The poets used the adjective Hyantius as equivalent to Boeoticus, or "rural", partly as a demonstration of how conversant they were with such arcane details:

Thus, then, Hyantius to his Partners spake,
That trod the Mazes of the pathlesse Wood:
My Friends our nets and javelins reake with blood:
Enough hath been the fortune of this day: —(Ovid)

The speaker is Actaeon, grandson of Cadmus, who came to an end somewhat similar to that of Hyas.

Notes

References

 Carl A.P. Ruck and Danny Staples, The World of Classical Myth, 1994. Part III: The Liminal Hero
 Gaius Julius Hyginus, Astronomica from The Myths of Hyginus translated and edited by Mary Grant. University of Kansas Publications in Humanistic Studies. Online version at the Topos Text Project.
 Gaius Julius Hyginus, Fabulae from The Myths of Hyginus translated and edited by Mary Grant. University of Kansas Publications in Humanistic Studies. Online version at the Topos Text Project.
 Harry Thurston Peck, Harpers Dictionary of Classical Antiquities, 1898. "Hyantes"
 Publius Ovidius Naso, Fasti translated by James G. Frazer. Online version at the Topos Text Project.
 Publius Ovidius Naso, Fasti. Sir James George Frazer. London; Cambridge, MA. William Heinemann Ltd.; Harvard University Press. 1933. Latin text available at the Perseus Digital Library.
 William Smith, editor. A Dictionary of Greek and Roman Biography and Mythography: "Hyantes"

External links 

 Pereus Lookup Tool: Hyantes"

Mythological Greek archers
Children of Atlas
Demigods in classical mythology
Boeotian characters in Greek mythology
Boeotian mythology